Alan Connolly may refer to:
 Alan Connolly (cricketer)
 Alan Connolly (hurler)